In ancient Greek religion and mythology, the Theban hero Tenerus (Ancient Greek: Τήνερος) was the son and prophet of Apollo. His mother was Melia, a daughter of the Titan Oceanus.

Mythology 
According to Pausanias, Melia, who had been abducted by Apollo, gave birth to Tenerus and his brother Ismenus, the eponym of the Theban river. The Teneric plain, Northwest of Thebes was named after Tenerus.

Tenerus was a priest and prophet of Apollo, and had an oracle at the Ismenion, the Temple of Apollo at Thebes. The late 6th–early 5th century BC Theban poet Pindar, called Tenerus "the temple tending seer",  and referred to him as "mighty Tenerus, chosen prophet of oracles", to whom Apollo entrusted the city of Thebes, "because of his wise courage", and whom Poseidon honored "above all mortals". A very fragmentary Pindaric Paean, was perhaps addressed to Tenerus. Its first line has the singer sing: "(I come to?) the giver of divine oracles" and in line thirteen "we speak of the hero Tenerus", with mentions in the immediately succeeding lines of "bulls",  "before the altar", "they sang a song", and "oracle". Lycophron, refers to Thebes, or perhaps more generally Boeotia, as the "land and temples of Teneros". Pausanias says that Tenerus was given "the art of divination", by his father Apollo. Tenerus was also perhaps connected with the Ptoion, the oracular sanctuary of Apollo Ptoieus at the foot of Mount Ptoion.

Notes

References
 Drachmann, Anders Bjørn, Scholia vetera in Pindari carmina, Vol. II, Lipsiae, 1910. Internet Archive.
 Fontenrose, Joseph Eddy, Python: A Study of Delphic Myth and Its Origins, University of California Press, 1959. .
 Grenfell, Bernard P., Arthur S, Hunt,  The Oxyrhynchus Papyri Part X, London, Egypt Exploration Fund, 1914. Internet Archive
 Grimal, Pierre, The Dictionary of Classical Mythology, Wiley-Blackwell, 1996, .
 Hornblower, Simon, Lykophron: Alexandra: Greek Text, Translation, Commentary, and Introduction Oxford University Press, 2015. .
 Larson, Jennifer, "Greek Nymphs : Myth, Cult, Lore", Oxford University Press (US). June 2001. 
 Lycophron, Alexandra (or Cassandra) in Callimachus and Lycophron with an English translation by A. W. Mair ; Aratus, with an English translation by G. R. Mair, London: W. Heinemann, New York: G. P. Putnam 1921. Internet Archive.
 Pausanias, Pausanias Description of Greece with an English Translation by W.H.S. Jones, Litt.D., and H.A. Ormerod, M.A., in 4 Volumes. Cambridge, Massachusetts, Harvard University Press; London, William Heinemann Ltd. 1918. Online version at the Perseus Digital Library.
 Race, William H., Pindar: Nemean Odes. Isthmian Odes. Fragments, Edited and translated by William H. Race. Loeb Classical Library No. 485. Cambridge, Massachusetts: Harvard University Press, 1997. . Online version at Harvard University Press.
 Rutherford, Ian, Pindar's Paeans: A Reading of the Fragments with a Survey of the Genre, Oxford University Press, 2001. .
 Schachter, Albert (1967), "A Boeotian Cult Type" in Bulletin of the Institute of Classical Studies (BICS), No. 14, pp. 1–16. 
 Schachter, Albert (1981), Cults of Boiotia, vol. I, University of London, Institute of Classical Studies, Bulletin Supplement 38.1. .
 Strabo, Geography, translated by Horace Leonard Jones; Cambridge, Massachusetts: Harvard University Press; London: William Heinemann, Ltd. (1924). Online version at the Perseus Digital Library, Books 6–14
 Tzetzes, Scolia eis Lycophroon, edited by Christian Gottfried Müller, Sumtibus F.C.G. Vogelii, 1811. Internet Archive

Children of Apollo
Demigods in classical mythology
Theban mythology
Religion in ancient Boeotia